The term Turk may refer to either the Turkish peoples in general, or a specific one of these peoples, typically the Turkish people:
 History of the Turkish people
 History of the Turkic peoples